Imelda Wiguna (also known as Imelda Wigoena, born 12 October 1951) is a former badminton player from Indonesia who played at the world class level from the mid-1970s through the mid-1980s.

Career
A doubles specialist, Wiguna's two most impressive years in badminton were 1979 and 1980. In 1979 she won both doubles events, women's doubles with Verawaty Wiharjo and mixed doubles with Christian Hadinata, at the prestigious All-England Championships. The following year she reached the final of both events at the then triennial IBF World Championships in Jakarta, losing the women's doubles with Verawaty but winning the mixed doubles with Christian. Thereafter, though Wiguna continued to play at a high level, the demands of motherhood and strong competition from Chinese Mainland players made winning the biggest tournaments more difficult. Her other titles included women's doubles at the Asian Games (1978), the Danish Open (1978), the Canadian Open (1979), and the Southeast Asian Games (1979, 1985); and mixed doubles at the Canadian Open (1979), and the Southeast Asian Games (1979, 1981, 1985).

Wiguna played in five consecutive Uber Cup (women's international team) competitions for Indonesia between 1974 and 1986. She helped her nation to capture its first world title (over Japan) in 1975, and to reach the final round in 1978, 1981, and 1986.

Achievements 
Women's doubles

Mixed doubles

References

External links
 

1951 births
Living people
Indonesian female badminton players
Indonesian Christians
World Games medalists in badminton
World Games bronze medalists
Competitors at the 1981 World Games
Asian Games medalists in badminton
Asian Games gold medalists for Indonesia
Asian Games silver medalists for Indonesia
Asian Games bronze medalists for Indonesia
Badminton players at the 1974 Asian Games
Badminton players at the 1978 Asian Games
Badminton players at the 1986 Asian Games
Medalists at the 1974 Asian Games
Medalists at the 1978 Asian Games
Medalists at the 1986 Asian Games
Southeast Asian Games medalists in badminton
Southeast Asian Games gold medalists for Indonesia
Competitors at the 1979 Southeast Asian Games
Competitors at the 1981 Southeast Asian Games
Competitors at the 1985 Southeast Asian Games
20th-century Indonesian women
21st-century Indonesian women